Harbour Air Seaplanes is a scheduled floatplane service, tour and charter airline  based in Richmond, British Columbia, Canada. The predominantly seaplane airline specializes in routes between Vancouver, Nanaimo, Victoria, Sechelt, Comox, Whistler and the Gulf Islands, primarily with de Havilland Canada floatplanes. Harbour Air operates de Havilland Beavers, Otters and Twin Otters.

History 

The airline was established and started operations in 1982  as Windoak Air Service to provide seaplane charter services for the forestry industry in British Columbia. In 1993, Harbour Air purchased Trans-Provincial Airlines, added charter flights to resorts, and increased scheduled services. Today, Harbour Air refers to itself as the world's largest all-seaplane airline and became North America's first carbon neutral airline. A small subsidiary, Harbour Air Malta, was set up in June 2007 and a DHC-3 Turbo Otter floatplane is permanently based in Valletta, Malta for scheduled flights to Gozo and sightseeing trips around the islands. Harbour Air Magazine is the official in-flight magazine of Harbour Air.

On May 9, 2012 Harbour Air purchased Whistler Air.

In September 2013, Harbour Air launched a land-based charter carrier, which operate one Cessna 182 Skylane as ICAO airline designator TTU, and telephony TANTALUS.

In November 2015, Harbour Air purchased Salt Spring Air.

Harbour Air and Kenmore Air started a new seaplane service between Downtown Vancouver, and Downtown Seattle on April 26, 2018

In March 2019, Harbour Air announced a partnership with magniX to electrify the entire Harbour Air fleet over the long term. Harbour Air has noted that its initial electric-powered commercial flights will be on routes of under 30 minutes' duration. The first converted aircraft was a DHC-2 Beaver which serves as the test prototype for the magniX motor, energy storage, and control systems. The prototype flew for the first time on December 10, 2019. The company hopes to have the aircraft certified for commercial use by 2021.

In 2007, Harbour Air became the first airline in North America to achieve complete carbon neutrality in both flight services and corporate operations. Teamed up with Vancouver-based Offsetters, the airline started to include a carbon offset on each ticket used to mitigate the environmental impact of the greenhouse gas emissions (GHG's) associated with the flight. The funds are invested in renewable energy projects.

On February 16, 2010, Deloitte Canada announced that Harbour Air was a winner of a 2009 Canada's 50 Best Managed Companies Award. This national award is sponsored by Deloitte, Canadian Imperial Bank of Commerce, National Post and Smith School of Business.

On March 31, 2010, Harbour Air completed the acquisition of West Coast Air and consolidated their terminal services.

On May 20, 2011, Harbour Air grounded its service from Victoria Harbour to Langley Regional Airport due to low passenger numbers and fuel price surges.

In November 2015, Salt Spring Air was purchased by the Harbour Air Group. Salt Spring Air's fleet now joins Harbour Air, West Coast Air and Whistler Air and now claims to be largest seaplane airline in the world.

Electric aviation
In March 2019, Harbour Air announced plans to convert an aircraft to run on electricity, which would serve as a test prototype during a two-year duration regulatory approval process, and eventually hopes to convert its entire fleet to electric propulsion. The first plane to be converted is a de Havilland Canada DHC-2 Beaver.

The electric prototype made its first flight over 4 minutes off the Fraser River near Vancouver on December 10, 2019.
Harbour Air wants to convert all its 34 aircraft, including Beavers and Pratt & Whitney Canada PT6-powered Otters and Twin Otters.

The plane completed its first point-to-point flight, from Vancouver to Victoria Airport Water Aerodrome near Sidney on Vancouver Island, on August 18, 2022, travelling  in 24 minutes. The aircraft was displayed at the British Columbia Aviation Museum open house on August 20.

Awards and accolades

Harbour Air has won the following awards:

 2009 to 2014 – Canada's Best Managed Companies
 2009 to 2011 – BC's Top 55 Employers
 2011 – BC's Top 100 Employers for Young People
 2011 – Business of the Year: Victoria Chamber of Commerce
 2011 – Canada Tourism Commission Signature Experience Award
 2011/2016 – Business of the Year on Vancouver Island: Business Examiner / Business Vancouver Island
 2012 – Cumberbatch Award: Guild of Air Pilots and Air Navigators
 2012/2015 – Canada's 10 Most Admired Corporate Cultures
 2015 – Greater Victoria Chamber of Commerce Business Awards – Outstanding Customer Service
 2015 – VISA Canada Traveller Experience of the Year/Tourism Industry Association of Canada

Destinations 
As of February 2021, Harbour Air serves the following destinations (some destinations are seasonal):

Fleet 
As of February 2023, the Harbour Air fleet consisted of 40 aircraft and 43 registered with Transport Canada:

Gallery

See also
 List of seaplane operators

Explanatory notes
AOC number is used for Harbour Air Seaplanes, Whistler Air, Salt Spring Air and West Coast Air.

References

External links 

 

1982 establishments in British Columbia
Airlines established in 1982
Charter airlines of Canada
Companies based in Richmond, British Columbia
Regional airlines of British Columbia
Seaplane operators